Belu (also Belos or Behale) was the Portuguese name for eastern part of Timor island, which included the kingdoms of Wehali, Lichisana and Suai-Cabanaza. In 1756 the western part of Belu and West Timor fell to the Dutch.

See also 
 History of East Timor

References

Portuguese Timor
Former Portuguese colonies